Ralli quilts are traditional quilts with appliqué and patchwork handmade by women artisans of Sindh's remote areas. The craft belongs to Sindh Pakistan, western India, and surrounding areas.  Embroidery designs and motifs indicate perceived on painted pottery from the area's ancient civilizations. Mothers used to explain several inheritance patterns to their daughters. The quilt made with the same was called Rilli or Ralli quilt.

References

Quilting
Textile arts of Pakistan
Culture of Sindh
Sindhi culture